Stud is an English/ Northern Irish rock band from the early 1970s, that featured two members of Taste - bassist Charlie McCracken and drummer John Wilson - along with former Family and Eric Burdon & the Animals member - bass guitarist John Weider - and ex Blossom Toes member Jim Cregan.

Never a very commercially successful band, Stud had its biggest successes in Germany.

History 
The band began as a trio featuring Cregan (born James Cregan, 9 March 1946, in Yeovil, Somerset), McCracken (born Richard McCracken, 26 June 1948, in Omagh, County Tyrone, Northern Ireland) and Wilson (born 6 November 1947, in Belfast, Northern Ireland), following the split of Rory Gallagher's Taste on 31st December 1970, then joined by ex Family violinist Weider (born 21 April 1947, in Shepherd's Bush, London) in June 1971. Their debut LP was released by Deram, but achieved only little success. Due to poor sales, Deram declined to produce a follow up.

Gaining more success in Germany while touring and featured on TV, the band signed to BASF label and released the second album in 1972, housed in memorable gatefold cover. Nevertheless, the band split soon after. A third album was released posthumous by BASF. Wilson tried to resurrect the band name by recruiting Andy Sneddon (bass, ex East of Eden) and Snowy White (guitar), but this line-up never recorded and dissolved.

Post Stud projects 
Jim Cregan joined Family on bass in August 1972 and was later in Cockney Rebel and Rod Stewart's band. Richard McCrecken joined for a revamped Spencer Davis Group and Fastway. Wilson took part in a mid 70s incarnation of Skid Row, joining Brush Shiels. He later continued playing sessions and live work in Belfast. Snowy White joined Pink Floyd as a touring musician, Thin Lizzy and worked as a solo artist.

Discography

Stud (Deram Records, 1971)
Track Listing
Side One
 "Sail On" - (Jim Cregan, Richard McCracken, John Wilson) - 4:12
 "Turn Over The Pages" - (Cregan) - 4:17
 "1112235" - (Cregan, McCracken, Wilson) - 12:20
Side Two
 "Harpo's Head" - (Cregan, McCracken, Wilson) - 7:35
 "Horizon" - (Cregan, McCracken, Wilson) - 11:07
 "Here - Part 1"
 "There - Part 2"
 "Song" - (Cregan) - 2:33
Personnel
 Jim Cregan - lead and acoustic guitars, lead vocals
 Richard McCracken - bass, double bass
 John Wilson - drums

September (BASF Records, 1972)
Track Listing
Side One
 "Good Things" - (John Weider) - 4:00
 "God Knows" - (Jim Cregan, Richard McCracken) - 6:03
 "Corner" - (McCracken) - 1:50
 "Life Without Music" - (Weider) - 7:22
 "Samurai" - (Cregan) - 2:21
Side Two
 "Five To Mid-day" - (Cregan) - 6:05
 "Prelude" - (Weider) - 2:10
 "Bad Handlin" - (Weider) - 3:30
 "Ocean Boogie" - (Cregan) - 3:25
 "Red Wine" - (Weider) - 4:23
Personnel
 Jim Cregan - lead electric guitar, acoustic guitar, lead vocals
 John Weider - rhythm electric guitar, violin, piano, vocals
 Richard McCracken - bass guitar, acoustic guitar
 John Wilson - drums, percussion

Goodbye: Live at Command (BASF Records, 1973)
Track Listing
Side One
 "Samurai" - (Jim Cregan) - 2:45
 "Big Bill's Banjo Bend" - (John Weider) - 1:07
 "Horizon" - (Cregan, Wilson, McCracken) - 19:48
Side Two
 "Ocean Boogie" - (Cregan) - 3:27
 "Harpo's Head No. 2" - (Cregan, Wilson, McCracken) - 4:23
Personnel
 Jim Cregan - lead electric guitar, acoustic guitar, lead vocals
 John Weider - rhythm electric guitar, violin, piano, vocals
 Richard McCracken - bass guitar, acoustic guitar
 John Wilson - drums, percussion

References

Rock music groups from Northern Ireland
English rock music groups
Deram Records artists